Paul Ikechukwu Obiefule  (born 15 May 1986 in Owerri) is a Nigerian retired footballer.

Club career
Obiefule began his career in his home country of Nigeria playing for Planners FC and then Heartland, where he spent two months before being spotted by Danish side Viborg FF, who signed him in 2004. During his time at Viborg he attracted much interest from many overseas clubs but in 2007 it was announced that he had signed a one-year deal for the Norwegian club Lyn, in September 2008 signed a new contract, lasting until the end of 2011 and Was Handed Over The Captain Band Making him the First Black to Captain a Norwegian Premiership Club Obiefule was a transfer target for English Championship side Watford, Scottish Aberdeen and Norwegian Hønefoss. Obiefule verbally agreed on 14 December 2009 for a 3-year long contract with Hønefoss because of a knee injury that jeopardised his moves to either Scotland or England. Obiefule agreed on 6 months loan for Lillestrøm on 2 August 2011 and was drafted into the game against Tromsø the next day, 3 August, without training with his new teammate.
In February 2012 Obiefule signed a contract for the 2012 season with Finnish Veikkausliiga team KuPS.

In November 2012, Obiefule was back training with Viborg FF ahead of a proposed move to an unknown Chinese team.

In August 2015, Obiefule agreed for a contract with Danish club Holstebro, after playing for Møldrup/Tostrup. He retired in 2017.

Career statistics

International career
Obiefule is a full Nigerian international and made his debut for the Super Eagles in the LG tournament in 2004. He was a member of Super Eagles squad that won bronze in Egypt in 2006. He has been capped 10 times for his country.

Personal life
Obiefule was studying agricultural economics at the Federal University of Technology Owerri in Nigeria but gave it up to pursue a professional football career.

His younger brother Polycarp Obinna Obiefule, plays currently for Mosta F.C. in Malta. His brother Pol broke a record as the highest goal ever scored in Maltese Premier League in the 2011/2012 Season with 34 Goals. Formerly member of Planners F.C. Owerri Imo State Nigeria.

References

External links
Stats at LynFotball.net

1986 births
Living people
People from Owerri
Nigerian footballers
Nigerian expatriate footballers
Nigeria international footballers
2006 Africa Cup of Nations players
Heartland F.C. players
Lyn Fotball players
Viborg FF players
Hønefoss BK players
Lillestrøm SK players
Kuopion Palloseura players
Assyriska FF players
Danish Superliga players
Eliteserien players
Superettan players
Expatriate men's footballers in Denmark
Expatriate footballers in Norway
Expatriate footballers in Finland
Expatriate footballers in Sweden
Federal University of Technology Owerri alumni
Veikkausliiga players
Association football midfielders
Sportspeople from Imo State